Union Sportive Créteil-Lusitanos (commonly referred to as US Créteil, USC, or simply Créteil) is a French football club based in Créteil, a southeastern suburb of Paris. The club was founded in 1936 and currently play in the Championnat National 2, the fourth level of French football. The football club forms part of an omnisports club that is also known for its handball team.

US Créteil was founded in 1936 as an omnisports club and have a rich history, despite achieving minimal honours.

The club has won the Division d'Honneur on two occasions in 1962 and 1986. In 1987, Créteil were crowned champions of the now-defunct Division 4 and, a year later, captured the Division 3 title. The club's best finish in the prestigious Coupe de France was during the 1985–86 edition of the competition when the team reached the quarter-finals. For eight consecutive seasons (1999–2007), Créteil played in Ligue 2, the second division of French football. It returned to Ligue 2 in the 2013–14 season. In 2018, the club was relegated to the Championnat National 2.

The team is affectionately known as Les Béliers ("The Rams") or Les Cristoliens, the name given to the inhabitants of Créteil.

History
Association football ventured to the city of Créteil relatively late compared to other communes located in and around Paris. The first club to enter the fray was Club Sportif de Créteil. However, the club was considered unstable from the start and was declared unofficial as the city was attempting to replicate the passion and heart clubs such as Red Star 93, CA Paris-Charenton, and Racing Club de France displayed in nearby communes. The declaration soon came to fruition following the foundation of Union Sportive Créteil in 1936 by a man commonly known as M. Hemon. Créteil spent almost 30 years hovering in the lower divisions. During this time, the football club played its home matches at the Stade Desmont, which seated only 800 spectators. Under the leadership of B. Hainque, Créteil reached the Championnat de France amateur in 1962. The team then proceeded to falter back into the Promotion d'Honneur before reaching the Division d'Honneur in the new decade.

Créteil were a lucky beneficiary in 1978 when the French Football Federation announced the creation of the Division 4. The club was promoted to the new league despite its 7th-place finish in the Division d'Honneur the previous season. The team's shaky form showed as they were in dead last after ten matches were contested. By the end of the season, Créteil were back in the Division d'Honneur. In 1983, the club moved into its new stadium, the Stade Dominique Duvauchelle, after having spent almost 50 years at the Stade Desmont. Two years later, under the guidance of the city's deputy mayor Laurent Cathala, Union Sportive Créteil merged with the Créteil omnisports club in order to give the city a better sporting identity. The club's main sports became football, swimming, athletics, and cycling.

US Créteil spent the 2000s between the third division and Ligue 2 before being relegated back to Championnat de France National. In 2002, the club merged with its neighbor Lusitanos, from Saint-Maur-des-Fossés, changing its name to the current Créteil-Lusitanos.

In the 2012–13 season, the club was promoted back to Ligue 2 and they reached the round of 16 in the 2012 Coupe de France competition before being eliminated by Girondins de Bordeaux. In 2016, the club was relegated from Ligue 2 back to the Championnat National. In 2018, US Créteil were relegated to the Championnat National 2 after finishing bottom of the table.

On 27 May 2019, Créteil were promoted back to the Championnat National after finishing as champions of the Championnat National 2 Group D. They were relegated in May 2022, finishing 17th in the 2021–22 season.

Supporters
The club has a small but loyal and fanatical fan-base, mostly from Val-de-Marne, the southern and eastern suburbs of Paris. The club has two ultras groups; Urban Devils founded in 2002, later re-formed in 2005 and Kop de Banlieue founded in 2004. The fans are known as the Cristoliens, inhabitants of Créteil.

Despite playing in a modern facility, the club's level attendance is very low, averaging only around 500 spectators during the Championnat National years, although after promotion that number has risen to around 2500 per game in Ligue 2.

The club has rivalries with Red Star F.C. and Paris FC, with whom they contest the Parisian derbies.

Attendances
Average attendances:
2016–17: 508
2015–16: 2 188
2014–15: 2 389
2013–14: 2 603
2012–13: 945
2011–12: 424
2010–11: 515
2009–10: 695
2008–09: 373
2007–08: 403

Stadium

Créteil play its home matches at the 12,000-seat Stade Dominique Duvauchelle, named after Dominique Duvauchelle, a local sports journalist from the city of Créteil.

Players

Current squad

Reserve squad

Former players 
For a complete list of former US Créteil-Lusitanos players with a Wikipedia article, see here.

  Cédric N'Koum

 Managers 

 Current coaching staff As of 27 June 2014.

 Managerial history 
US Créteil-Lusitanos has had numerous managers and caretaker managers since the club's foundation in 1936. The list below begins with the club's managers since 1986.Managers in italics were hired as caretakers Honours 
Championnat NationalChampions (1): 2013
Division 4 (CFA 2)Champions (1): 1987, 2019
Division d'Honneur (Île-de-France)Champions (2): 1962, 1986
Coupe de Paris - Ile de FranceChampions'' (1) 1998
Note:

References

External links 
 
 Unofficial website ran by supporters

 
Créteil
Créteil
Créteil
Sport in Val-de-Marne